Sk82death is an Australian skateboarding television series, featuring various dangerous, crude, ridiculous, and self-injuring stunts and pranks. The series is produced by and stars Sean Caveny.

Awards 
2006 and 2007 Antenna Awards for best Camerawork, as well as the 2007 Antenna's for Best Sports Program and Best Youth Program.

External links 
  sk82death website
  C31 website
  Antenna Awards (C31 website)
  sk2death episodes streamed online

Australian non-fiction television series
Skateboarding mass media